Arnoldo Giovanni Martignoni (19 May 1901 – 9 March 1984) was a Swiss ice hockey player who competed in the 1928 Winter Olympics.

He was a member of the Swiss ice hockey team, which won the bronze medal.

External links
profile

1901 births
1984 deaths
Ice hockey players at the 1928 Winter Olympics
Medalists at the 1928 Winter Olympics
Olympic ice hockey players of Switzerland
Olympic medalists in ice hockey
Olympic bronze medalists for Switzerland